Sławosz Szydłowski (20 July 1894 – 24 January 1952) was a Polish athlete. He competed in the men's discus throw and the men's javelin throw at the 1924 Summer Olympics.

References

External links
 

1894 births
1952 deaths
Athletes (track and field) at the 1924 Summer Olympics
Polish male discus throwers
Polish male javelin throwers
Olympic athletes of Poland
People from Staszów County
Sportspeople from Świętokrzyskie Voivodeship